Chris Landman (born 17 January 1981) is a Dutch professional darts player, currently playing in the Professional Darts Corporation (PDC) events.

Career
In 2017, Landman won the Catalonian Open, reached the quarter-final of the WDF World Cup Singles, and reached the Last 16 of the World Masters. He qualified for the 2018 BDO World Darts Championship as one of the Regional Table Qualifiers, losing to Derk Telnekes 0-3 in the preliminary round. He qualified for the 2019 BDO World Darts Championship losing in the 1st round to Kyle McKinstry 3-2. He also qualified the year after and had his best result to date reaching the Quarter final after beating Dave Parletti & Ben Hazel before losing to eventual champion Wayne Warren 5-3.

In 2021 Landman reached the 2022 PDC World Darts Championship by winning a West Europe Qualifier beating Mats Gies in the final 6-3. He played former BDO World Champion Scott Mitchell  in the Last 96 beating him 3-0 this set up a clash with seeded player Ian White in the last 64. Landman lost 3-1, Landman then went to Q School where he failed to gain a tourcard.

In 2022, Landman won the Northern Ireland Matchplay beating Shaun Griffiths 5–1.

In 2023, he won the first PDC Challenge Tour event, defeating Lukas Wenig 5–2 in the final.

World Championship results

BDO/WDF
 2018: Preliminary round (lost to Derk Telnekes 0–3) (sets)
 2019: First round (lost to Kyle McKinstry 2–3)
 2020: Quarter-finals (lost to Wayne Warren 3–5)
 2023:

PDC
 2022: Second round (lost to Ian White 1–3)

Performance timeline

External links
 Chris Landman's profile and stats on Darts Database

References

1981 births
Living people
Dutch darts players
British Darts Organisation players
21st-century Dutch people